Alair is a town in the state of Telangana in India. Alair may also refer to:

 Alair (Assembly constituency), constituency of the Telangana Legislative Assembly
 Alair (footballer) (born 1982), Brazilian professional footballer
 Alair Cruz Vicente (born 1981), Brazilian professional footballer